Crenicichla phaiospilus is a species of cichlid native to South America. It is found in the Amazon River basin, in the Xingu River drainage at Cachoeira von Martius and Goritire, Brazil.

References

phaiospilus
Freshwater fish of Brazil
Fish of the Amazon basin
Taxa named by Sven O. Kullander
Fish described in 1991